Nikolay Krylov may refer to:

Nikolay Krylov (marshal) (1903–1972), Soviet marshal
Nikolay Krylov (mathematician, born 1879) (1879–1955), Russian mathematician
Nikolay Krylov (mathematician, born 1941) (born 1941), Russian mathematician
Nikolay Krylov (physicist) (1917–1947), Russian physicist

See also
Krylov (disambiguation)